Little Bull Lake may refer to:

 Little Bull Lake (Algoma District), Ontario, Canada
 Little Bull Lake (Sudbury District), Ontario, Canada